Hoseah Partsch is a New Zealand-Australian singer-songwriter who was the runner-up of the sixth series of The Voice Australia in 2017 behind the winner Judah Kelly. Partsch was signed to Universal Music Australia and released "Paper Planes" which peaked at number 35 on the ARIA charts. Partsch toured with Culture Club in 2017.

Early life
Hoseah Partsch was born in Auckland, New Zealand as one of four children. He shared one bedroom with his siblings. The family moved to Australia at the end of 2011 and resides in Cranbourne West, Victoria, Australia and attended Dandenong High School. Partsch taught himself to play piano.

Music career

2017: The Voice
In 2017 Partsch auditioned for the  sixth season of The Voice Australia. In his blind audition,  all four chairs were turned and joined team Boy George. Partsch made it to the grand finale and ultimately placed runner-up.
 denotes runner-up.
 denotes a song that reached the top 10 on iTunes.

Immediately following the show, Partsch was signed to Universal Music Australia and released "Paper Planes". The song peaked at number 35 on the ARIA charts with 5147 sales.

Following the show, Boy George asked Partsch if he would join Culture Club on their national tour in December. 

Since October 2017, Partsch has modelled with menswear brand Johnny Bigg.

Discography

Singles

References

External links
 
 

Australian pop singers
Living people
The Voice (Australian TV series) contestants
Year of birth missing (living people)
Musicians from Auckland
Musicians from Melbourne
21st-century Australian male singers
New Zealand emigrants to Australia
People from Cranbourne, Victoria